The Tswapong Hills are a mountain range in the Central District, Botswana. They rise to an elevation of 300 to 400 m above the hardveld of the almost 900 m high surrounding plateau. Geologically, these flat-topped hills are similar to the Waterberg Massif, located about 100 km to the south.

The Tswapong Range receives relatively more moisture than the surrounding sandy plain of Mopane woodland. The rocky cliffs are made of porous rock that absorbs rainwater, which then seeps out forming permanent cascades and pools, such as the Phothophotho Gorge.

The Lotsane River flows at the feet of the Tswapong Hills on their northern side. One of the main attractions of the hills is the spectacular Moremi Gorge.

Inhabited places

The former capital of the Ngwato Kingdom was in Phalatswe, also called Old Palapye, at the western end of the Tswapong Range.

Moeng is a village located in the midst of the range at an altitude of 945 m. The village of Letsheng is located at the western end of the hills, while Matlakola and Maunatlala are on the northern side. At the base of the southern side there are the small villages of Tau, Gootau, Ratholo and Majwaneng. Lerala lies at the southeastern end of the range.

Ecology
The Tswapong Range is not a protected area. The hills, however, provide one of the two breeding sites in Botswana for the cape vulture, a vulnerable species. Other birds found in the range are the black-collared barbet, the mocking chat and the red-winged starling.

This range is also one of the few areas where the Jameson's red rock hare can be found. Among the other wildlife found in the Tswapong Range, the leopard, brown hyena, kudu, rock hyrax,  baboon and crested porcupine deserve mention. There are also two butterfly species endemic to the Tswapong Hills.

See also
Tswapong language
Tuli Block

References

External links 

 Birdlife - Botswana
The Politics of Space and Place in the Tswapong Region, Central Botswana
Climbing in the Tswapong Hills

Mountains of Botswana
Central District (Botswana)